Extreme Clutter  (previously stylized as Enough Already! with Peter Walsh) is an American reality television series on the Oprah Winfrey Network that debuted on January 1, 2011.  The series was renewed for a six-episode second season in April 2011, which premiered on January 2, 2012 with the new title of Extreme Clutter.

Premise
It has a format similar to Clean House. Some television critics have noted that the persons on the show who require the services of Walsh to organize their homes are not described as "hoarders", but rather as people with "clutter issues".

Episodes

Season 1 (2011)

Season 2 (2012)

References

External links
Official site

2010s American reality television series
2011 American television series debuts
2012 American television series endings
Oprah Winfrey Network original programming